Saturnino Perdriel (died 1888) was the Argentine founder and first president of Gimnasia y Esgrima La Plata.  He was a civil functionary in the Treasury Department of the Province of Buenos Aires.

Upon the death of Perdriel, Etcheverry would take up office as president.

External links 

  History of the Club
  Official Site of the Club

Gimnasia La Plata
1888 deaths
Argentine football chairmen and investors
Year of birth missing